Franz-Peter Hermann (born 22 March 1952) is a former German football coach and a player who is the current assistant coach of Borussia Dortmund.

Managerial career
Hermann took over Bayer Leverkusen from 1 June 1991 to 30 June 1991, 8 April 1995 to 10 April 1995, and 28 April 1996 to 30 June 1996. In his first stint as manager, he got a win and a loss in two matches. In his second stint, he won his only match in–charge. In his final stint, he won one match, drew one match, and lost three. He managed Bayer Leverkusen II from 17 February 2003 to 14 May 2003. He failed to win any of his matches as head coach. On 24 November 2015, Hermann became the interim manager of Fortuna Düsseldorf. On 6 October, Hermann became co-assistant manager at FC Bayern Munich under Jupp Heynckes, following the dismissal of Carlo Ancelotti. After the retirement of Jupp Heynckes, Hermann also followed the same footstep at the end of the season.

On 2 July 2018, Bayern's new head coach Niko Kovač announced that Hermann will remain as the assistant coach of the club and will join the coaching staff from 1 September.

Managerial record

Honours
DFB-Pokal finalist: 1973–74

References

External links

1952 births
Living people
German footballers
German football managers
Hamburger SV players
Alemannia Aachen players
Bayer 04 Leverkusen players
Bayer 04 Leverkusen managers
Fortuna Düsseldorf managers
Bayer 04 Leverkusen non-playing staff
FC Bayern Munich non-playing staff
Bundesliga players
2. Bundesliga players
Bundesliga managers
2. Bundesliga managers
Association football midfielders